Niwali tehsil is a fourth-order administrative and revenue division, a subdivision of third-order administrative and revenue division of Barwani district of Madhya Pradesh.

Geography
Niwali tehsil has an area of 385.51 sq kilometers. It is bounded by Barwani tehsil in the northwest, Rajpur tehsil in the north, Sendhwa tehsil in the northeast, east and southeast, Maharashtra in the south and southwest and Pansemal tehsil in the west.

See also 
Barwani district

Citations

External links

Tehsils of Madhya Pradesh
Barwani district